Bartosz Sroga (born 25 May 1976) is a Polish rower. He competed in the men's coxed pair event at the 1992 Summer Olympics.

References

1976 births
Living people
Polish male rowers
Olympic rowers of Poland
Rowers at the 1992 Summer Olympics
Sportspeople from Gdańsk